This is a list of public holidays in Burundi.

Dates of variable holidays

2021
Ascension: May 13
Eid al-Adha: July 20
2022
Labour Day: May 2
Ascension: May 25
Eid al-Adha: July 10
Christmas: December 26
2023
Ascension: May 18
Eid al-Adha: June 28
2024
Ascension: May 9
Eid al-Adha: June 17
2025
Ascension: May 29
Eid al-Adha: June 7

References

Burundian culture
Burundi
Holidays
Burundi